USNS Choctaw County (JHSV-2/T-EPF-2), (ex-Vigilant) is the second , which is operated by the United States Navys Military Sealift Command and was built in Mobile, Alabama.

Capabilities

The EPF can transport US Army and US Marine Corps company-sized units with their vehicles, or reconfigure to become a troop transport for an infantry battalion.  
 
It has a flight deck for helicopter operations and a loading ramp that allows vehicles to quickly drive on and off the ship. The ramp is suitable for the types of austere piers and quay walls common in developing countries. EPF has a shallow draft (under ).

Construction and career 
On 6 October 2011,  Secretary of the Navy Ray Mabus announced in Ackerman, Mississippi that the second Expeditionary Fast Transport, previously having been named Vigilant by the United States Army before the transfer of the EPF program to the Navy, would be named USNS Choctaw County. Since the ship will be operated by the Military Sealift Command and not the United States Navy itself, it will carry the USNS designation and not USS. The ship is named for three U.S. counties, located in Alabama, Mississippi, and Oklahoma, all three of which are named for the Choctaw tribe of American Indians.

The ship is laid down on 8 November 2011 and launched on 1 October 2012 by Austal USA. She was commissioned on 6 June 2013.

References

External links

 

Transports of the United States Navy
Spearhead-class Joint High Speed Vessels
2012 ships